Kampong Belais is a village in Temburong District, Brunei. The population is 141 in 2016. It is one of the villages within Mukim Bokok.

Administration 
For census and postcode purposes Kampong Belais is established as two villages:

Kampong Belais shares a village head with Kampong Buda-Buda.

Facilities 
The village mosque is Kampong Belais Mosque. The construction began in 1994 and completed in 1996. It can accommodate 300 worshippers.

Notes

References 

Belais